Niphona gracilior is a species of beetle in the family Cerambycidae. It was described by Stephan von Breuning in 1952.

References

gracilior
Beetles described in 1952